Maicon da Silva Moreira, simply known as Maicon (born 10 March 1993), is a Brazilian footballer who last played as a right midfielder or right defender for FC Tulsa in the USL Championship.

Club career
Born in Cachoeira do Sul, Rio Grande do Sul. Maicon first played for clubs in the state.

In 2011, he moved to Italy and joined Reggina Calcio's youth setup. He made his professional debut on 6 May 2012, in a 1–3 loss at Sampdoria, and after a brief loan period with Pontedera, he established himself in the club's starting XI.

Maicon joined American USL Championship club FC Tulsa in January 2020. In August 2020 FC Tulsa announced they mutually terminated his contract after just 7 months with the club.

References

External links

1993 births
Living people
Brazilian footballers
Association football defenders
Association football midfielders
Serie B players
Croatian Football League players
Reggina 1914 players
U.S. Livorno 1915 players
Sport Club do Recife players
NK Istra 1961 players
FC Tulsa players
Brazilian expatriate footballers
Expatriate footballers in Italy
Expatriate footballers in Croatia
Brazilian expatriate sportspeople in Italy
Brazilian expatriate sportspeople in Croatia
Expatriate soccer players in the United States
Brazilian expatriate sportspeople in the United States
Brazil youth international footballers